Replicants is the debut and only album from Replicants.

Reception

Although Replicants have a large fan base, the album was not regarded as a great success, and was seen as "not a total and utter trudge-fest, finding a weird balance between the relative exultance of the original, and the band's own mock metal heroics, adding in a bit of woozy semi-shoegaze psychedelia at the end." - Allmusic

Track listing

 "Just What I Needed" - 3:43 (The Cars)
 "Silly Love Songs" - 7:30 (Wings)
 "Life's a Gas" - 3:12 (T. Rex)
 "Cinnamon Girl" - 3:38 (Neil Young)
 "How Do You Sleep?" - 6:08 (John Lennon)
 "Destination Unknown" - 5:09 (Missing Persons)
 "No Good Trying" - 1:16 (Syd Barrett)
 "Are 'Friends' Electric?" - 4:30 (Gary Numan)
 "Dirty Work" - 4:56 (Steely Dan)
 "The Bewlay Brothers" - 7:14 (David Bowie)
 "Ibiza Bar" - 4:59 (Pink Floyd)

Track information

"Silly Love Songs" features Maynard James Keenan on guest vocals.

References

External links
 [ Allmusic Article] - Information on Replicants
 Silly Love Songs - YouTube video

1995 albums
Replicants (band) albums
Covers albums
Zoo Entertainment (record label) albums